Donn Cothaid mac Cathail, King of Connacht, died 773.

Donn Cothaid was a King of Connacht from the Ui Fiachrach Muaidhe branch of the Connachta. He was the great-grandson of Dúnchad Muirisci mac Tipraite (died 683). He was the last member of this branch to hold the throne of Connacht and ruled from 768 to 773.

Descendants

Donn Cothaid's son, Connmhach mac Duinn Cothaid (died 787), was a later king of the Ui Fiachrach. A grandson, Dubda mac Conmac, was grandfather of Aed Ua Dubhda, eponym and ancestor of the O'Dowd Chiefs of the Name.

Family tree

Notes

See also
Kings of Connacht

References

 Annals of Ulster
 Francis J.Byrne, Irish Kings and High-Kings 
 The Chronology of the Irish Annals, Daniel P. McCarthy

External links
CELT: Corpus of Electronic Texts at University College Cork

773 deaths
Kings of Connacht
Monarchs from County Mayo
8th-century Irish monarchs
Year of birth unknown